Charles Singleton may refer to:

Charles Laverne Singleton (1959–2004), executed American
C. T. Singleton, Jr. (1905–1977), American admiral
Charles S. Singleton (1909–1985), American scholar and literary critic
Charles Singleton (songwriter), aka Charlie "Hoss" Singleton, co-writer of "Strangers in the Night" and "Spanish Eyes"